The 2016 African Boxing Olympic Qualification Tournament for the boxing tournament at the 2016 Summer Olympics in Rio de Janeiro, Brazil was held in Yaoundé, Cameroon from March 11 to March 19, 2016.

Medalists

Men

Women

Qualification summary

Results

Men

Light flyweight (49 kg)

Flyweight (52 kg)

Bantamweight (56 kg)

Lightweight (60 kg)

Light welterweight (64 kg)

Welterweight (69 kg)

Middleweight (75 kg)

Light heavyweight (81 kg)

Heavyweight (91 kg)

Super heavyweight (+91 kg)

Women

Flyweight (51 kg)

Lightweight (60 kg)

Middleweight (75 kg) 
The two finalists will qualify.

References

Boxing Olympic Qualification Africa
Boxing qualification for the 2016 Summer Olympics
2016 in Cameroonian sport